Abū Ja'far Muḥammad ibn 'Alī ibn Nu'mān ibn Abī Ṭurayfa al-Bajalī al-Kūfī (Arabic: ابوجعفر محمّد بن علي بن نعمان ابن أبي طريفة البجلي الکوفي), known as Mu'min al-Ṭāq (مؤمن الطاق) was a companion of Ja'far al-Sadiq and a Shia theologian in the 2nd/8th century.
He was renowned for providing incisive and thought-provoking responses to questions from his opponents. He allegedly got into a heated argument with renowned scholar Abu Hanifa. He advocated for the rights of the imam and held that the imams are the only ones with the greatest knowledge required to lead humanity to felicity at its highest level. He wrote a number of works including Kitab al-imama and Kitab al-radd 'ala' al-Mu'tazila fi imamat al-mafdul.

Name
Muhammed ibn Ali ibn al-Nu'man's kunya was Abu Ja'far.
His opponents nicknamed him Shaytan al-Taq (Satan of taq). This is attributed, among other things, to the fact that he sought to exchange money in a market in "Taq al-Mahamil" in Kufa and due to his expertise to spot counterfeit money he earned the nickname. According to another source, Abu Hanifa was the first to call him by this nickname when he defeated Harawriya in a discussion. To refute abu-Hanifa, the Shias gave him the nickname Mu'min al-Taq (lit.The True Believer of the Gateway).
It is also said that when he defeated Abu Hanifa in a debate, Abu Hanifa called him "Shaytan al-Taq" for the first time. And when Hisham ibn al-Hakam heard this, he was the first person who called him "Mu'min al-Taq"

Position
Abu Ja'far Muhammad ibn Nu'man al-Ahwal stood out among the Kufa speculative theologians who connected the Imamate question to other fundamental scholastic problems. The heresiographers refer to his circle as AnNu'maniya, and he differentiated himself from the rest of Ja'far al-Sadiq's followers via his mastery of dialectics, his theological knowledge, and the sharpness of his rejoinders in debates with his opponents. Al-Ahwal, a fervent Shi'i, was initially one of the most dedicated followers of al-Baqir, whose claims he defended against Zayd. Later, he developed a reputation as a renowned theologian and became a passionate supporter first of al-Sadiq and then of Musa al-Kazim.

Al-Sadiq's view
Al-Sadiq obliged Mu'min al-Taq to debate with the religious intellectuals of that day. In the meantime, he prohibited his companions from doing this due to lack of mastery in this field.
Al-Sadiq praised him saying: "The most lovable people, alive and dead, to me are: Burayd ibn Mu'awiya al-'Ijli, Zurarah ibn A'yun, Muhammad bin Muslim, and Abu Ja'far al-Ahwal (Mu'min al-Taq)."

When al-Sadiq learned that this well-known follower was expressing differing viewpoints while participating in theological debates, he made the following statement:, "If I were to approve of and express satisfaction with the theological views which you (i.e., Mu'min al-Taq and his followers) express, I should be guilty of error (ḍalāl).On the other hand, it would be hard for me to dissociate from these views. After all, we are few and our enemies legion." Dissociation (bara'a),then, is a luxury which the Imams can ill afford, even if Mu'min al-Taq, Zurara, and their ilk deserve it in principle.

Debates
According to some hadiths, he debated Zayd ibn Ali with regard to the Imamate of al-Sadiq. Also his debates with Abu Hanifa, Ibn Abi Khidra, Dahhak Shadi from Khawarij, Ibn Abi l-'Awja', and others are cited.

It is said that al-Dahhak, from the Kharijites, went in revolt in Kufa and controlled it. Al-Dahhak headed their movements and called himself the Commander of the faithful. 
Mu'min al-Taq turned to him and said: "Surely I am a man with knowledge of my religion. I have heard that you describe justice, so I would like to enter (a debate) with you."
Al-Dahhak was happy at that and regarded it as a victory for him, so he said to his companions:
"Certainly, if this (Mu'min al-Taq) enter (a debate) with you, he will benefit you."
Mu'min al-Taq approached al-Dahhak and asked him the following question:
Why did you renounce Ali ibn Abi Talib?
Because he appointed someone as arbitrator in respect with the religion of Allah.
Do you regard as lawful killing him or fighting him who appoints someone as arbitrator in respect with the religion of Allah?
Yes?
Tell me about the religion on which I have come to debate with you: If my demonstration overcomes yours or yours overcomes mine, then who will draw the attention of the mistaken to his mistake and decide the rightness of the right? Therefore, we have no escape from that we must appoint someone to decide between us. 
This-he indicated with his hand to a companion of his-is the arbitrator between us; he has knowledge of the religion.
Mu'min al-Taq found a way to criticize him and to abolish his beliefs, saying to him:
Have you appointed this person as an arbitrator in respect with the religion on which I have to debate with you?
Yes.
Mu'min al-Taq came near to the Kharijites and showed them the mistakes of their leader, saying to them: "Surely, your leader has appointed someone as an arbitrator in respect with Allah's religion; then that is up to you!"
The Kharijites attacked al-Dahhak and cut him into pieces with their own swords.

Works
 Kitab al-Imama (a book of the Imamate).
 Kitab al-Ma'rifa (a book on knowledge).
 Kitab Ithbat al-Wasiya (the Establishment of the Will). 
 Kitab al-Radd 'alaa al-Mu'tazila fi Imamat al-Mafdul (a book on refuting the beliefs of the Mu'tazilites in the Imamate of the less excellent).
 Kitab fi amar Talha wa al-Zubayr wa 'Aa'isha (a book on the affair of Talha, al-Zubayr, and 'Aa'isha).
 Kitab If'al, La Taf'al (a book on do, do not do).
 Al-Munazara ma'a Abu Hanifa (a book on the debate with Abu Hanifa).
 Kalamihi ma'a al-Khawarijj (his Theological Debates with the Kharijites)

See also
 Imamah (Twelver Shi`i Doctrine)
 Twelver theology
 Islamic theology

References

Bibliography

External links
 Mu'min al-Taq

 
8th-century Muslim theologians
Shia hadith scholars
People from Kufa
Islamic philosophers
Writers of the medieval Islamic world

fa:مؤمن الطاق